Cape Fanning is a cape that forms the north side of the entrance to Violante Inlet, on the east coast of Palmer Land, Antarctica. It was discovered by the United States Antarctic Service in a flight from East Base on December 30, 1940, and was named by the Advisory Committee on Antarctic Names for Edmund Fanning, of Stonington, CT, and New York City, who in addition to actual Antarctic exploration in connection with his sealing and whaling business also vigorously promoted exploration by others under both private and public auspices. His book, Voyages Round the World, published in 1833, is an authoritative work on early American Antarctic exploration.

References 

Headlands of Palmer Land